Robert Finlay (born 3 August 1943) is a Canadian long-distance runner. He competed in the 5000 metres at the 1968 Summer Olympics and the 1972 Summer Olympics.

References

1943 births
Living people
Athletes (track and field) at the 1968 Summer Olympics
Athletes (track and field) at the 1972 Summer Olympics
Canadian male long-distance runners
Olympic track and field athletes of Canada
Athletes (track and field) at the 1967 Pan American Games
Pan American Games track and field athletes for Canada
English emigrants to Canada
Athletes from London